"For Sentimental Reasons" is a song by Abner Silver, Al Sherman and Edward Heyman, and was first released on October 18, 1936.  It was recorded by Tommy Dorsey and his Orchestra featuring a vocal by Jack Leonard,  and well as by Mildred Bailey and Her Orchestra.

References

Songs written by Al Sherman
Songs written by Abner Silver
Songs with lyrics by Edward Heyman
1936 songs
Tommy Dorsey songs
Mildred Bailey songs